Duillier Castle is a castle in the municipality of Duillier of the Canton of Vaud in Switzerland.  It is a Swiss heritage site of national significance.

See also
 List of castles in Switzerland
 Château

References

Cultural property of national significance in the canton of Vaud
Castles in Vaud